The 2014–15 Minnesota Wild season was the 15th season for the National Hockey League (NHL) franchise that was established on June 25, 1997.

Off-season
Following the team's 4–2 Western Conference Semifinals loss to the Chicago Blackhawks, General Manager Chuck Fletcher was tasked with deciding how to deal with the Wild's 21 free-agents, including 13 unrestricted and nine restricted free agents. The contract situation for all players, including UFAs Dany Heatley, Cody McCormick, Matt Moulson and Nate Prosser, needed to be decided before heading into the NHL's free agency period beginning on July 1, 2014.

Playoffs

The Minnesota Wild entered the playoffs as the Western Conference's first wild-card. After defeating the St. Louis Blues 4–2 in the first round, they advanced to the second round, where they were defeated by the Chicago Blackhawks for the third-straight season.

Standings

Suspensions/fines

Schedule and results

Pre-season

Regular season

Playoffs

Player statistics
Final stats 
Skaters

Goaltenders

†Denotes player spent time with another team before joining the Wild.  Stats reflect time with the Wild only.
‡Traded mid-season

Notable achievements

Awards

Milestones

Transactions
The Wild have been involved in the following transactions during the 2014–15 season.

Trades

Free agents acquired

Free agents lost

Claimed via waivers

Player signings

Draft picks

Below are the Minnesota Wild's selections made at the 2014 NHL Entry Draft, held on June 27–28, 2014 at the Wells Fargo Center in Philadelphia, Pennsylvania. 

Draft notes
The Minnesota Wild's second-round pick went to the Buffalo Sabres as the result of trade on April 3, 2013 that sent Jason Pominville, and a fourth-round pick in 2014 to Minnesota in exchange for Matt Hackett, Johan Larsson, a first-round pick in 2013 and this pick.
The Ottawa Senators' sixth-round pick went to Minnesota as the result of a trade on March 12, 2013 that sent Matt Kassian to Ottawa in exchange for this pick.
The Columbus Blue Jackets' sixth-round pick (previously acquired by the New York Rangers) went to Minnesota as the result of a trade on June 30, 2013 that sent Justin Falk to the Rangers in exchange for Benn Ferriero, and this pick.

References

Minnesota Wild seasons
Minnesota
Minnesota Wild season, 2014-15
Minnesota Wild
Minnesota Wild